The Morning After: Sex, Fear and Feminism on Campus is a 1993 book about date rape by author and journalist Katie Roiphe. Her first book, it was reprinted with a new introduction in 1994. Part of the book had previously been published as an essay, "The Rape Crisis, or 'Is Dating Dangerous?'" in the New York Times Magazine.

Reception
Christopher Lehmann-Haupt, writing for The New York Times, called The Morning After a "Book of the Times" and said "it is courageous of Ms. Roiphe to speak out against the herd ideas that campus life typically encourages." In 1993, a negative review by Katha Pollitt titled 'Not Just Bad Sex' was published in The New Yorker. Pollitt's review was in turn criticized by Christina Hoff Sommers in Who Stole Feminism? (1994). The Morning After received a positive response from the critic Camille Paglia, who called it "an eloquent, thoughtful, finely argued book that was savaged from coast to coast by shallow, dishonest feminist book reviewers". A criticism of the book is that it promotes victim-blaming.

See also
Sexual Violence: Opposing Viewpoints (2013)

References

External links
Amazon.com "Search inside this book."
The American Academy of Experts in Traumatic Stress excerpt adapted from The Morning After.

1993 non-fiction books
Books about feminism
Books by Katie Roiphe
English-language books
Feminism and sexuality
Gender studies books
Little, Brown and Company books
Works about violence against women